Christopher Cosser (born 12 December 2000) is a South African climber. He won the combined event at the 2020 African Climbing Championships. This qualified him for the combined event at the 2020 Summer Olympics, where he finished 16th out of 20 competitors.

References

South African rock climbers
Living people
2000 births
Sport climbers at the 2020 Summer Olympics
Sportspeople from Johannesburg
Olympic sport climbers of South Africa
Competitors at the 2022 World Games
21st-century South African people